Lisa York (born 10 March 1970) is a British former middle and long-distance runner. Born in Rugby, Warwickshire, she competed in the women's 3000 metres at the 1992 Barcelona Olympics, where she ran a lifetime best of 8:47.71 in her heat, to narrowly miss the final.

International competitions

References

External links
 

1970 births
Living people
Sportspeople from Rugby, Warwickshire
British female long-distance runners
British female cross country runners
English female middle-distance runners
English female long-distance runners
English female cross country runners
Olympic athletes of Great Britain
Athletes (track and field) at the 1992 Summer Olympics